Guzmania scherzeriana is a plant species in the genus Guzmania. This species is native to Central America (known from all countries except El Salvador), Colombia and Ecuador.

References

scherzeriana
Flora of Central America
Flora of Colombia
Plants described in 1896
Flora of Ecuador